Bergonzini is an Italian surname. Notable people with the surname include:

Luiz Gonzaga Bergonzini (1936–2012), Brazilian Roman Catholic bishop
Mauro Bergonzini (born 1912), Italian footballer

Italian-language surnames